La Côte Picarde was a professional cycling race held between 1986 and 2015 in Picardy, France. It was held as part of the UCI Europe Tour from 2005 onwards, in category 1.ncup, meaning it was part of the UCI Under 23 Nations' Cup.

Winners

References

Cycle races in France
UCI Europe Tour races
Recurring sporting events established in 1986
1986 establishments in France
Recurring sporting events disestablished in 2015
2015 disestablishments in France
Sport in Hauts-de-France